Nelson Trujillo (born 2 February 1960) is a Venezuelan boxer. He competed in the men's lightweight event at the 1980 Summer Olympics.

References

1960 births
Living people
Venezuelan male boxers
Olympic boxers of Venezuela
Boxers at the 1980 Summer Olympics
Place of birth missing (living people)
Lightweight boxers